Egypt, as the United Arab Republic, competed at the 1964 Summer Olympics in Tokyo, Japan. 73 competitors, all men, took part in 35 events in 9 sports.

Boxing

Fencing

Five fencers, all men, represented Egypt in 1964.

Men's foil
 Mohamed Gamil El-Kalyoubi
 Moustafa Soheim
 Sameh Abdel Rahman

Men's team foil
 Moustafa Soheim, Farid El-Ashmawi, Ahmed El-Hamy El-Husseini, Mohamed Gamil El-Kalyoubi, Sameh Abdel Rahman

Football

Gymnastics

Rowing

Shooting

Six shooters represented Egypt in 1964.

25 m pistol
 Abdallah Zohdy

50 m pistol
 Hassan El-Sayed Attia

50 m rifle, prone
 Mohamed Amin Fikry
 Mohamed Sami El-Khatib

Trap
 Mohamed Mehrez
 Ahmed Kadry Genena

Water polo

Weightlifting

Wrestling

References

External links
Official Olympic Reports

Nations at the 1964 Summer Olympics
1964
Olympics